Bodrožić is a surname found among Croats and Serbs.

The surname is found in the Dalmatian hinterland, in the villages of Laktac, Koljane, Kosore, Biočić, and Žitnić. A family migrated to Sajković from Koljane in the 19th century. The Orthodox Bodrožić have the slava (patron saint) of St. Stephen, except for those in Kosore, which have St. Sava.

Ivana Bodrožić (born 1982), Croatian writer and poet
Josip Bodrožić (born 1973), Australian-Croatian kickboxer
Marica Bodrožić (born 1973), Croatian-born German writer
Milica Bodrožić, Serbian writer

Croatian surnames
Serbian surnames